Overbrook High School is a public, four-year secondary school in Philadelphia, Pennsylvania.

School
Overbrook High School is designated by the School District of Philadelphia as Location #402, in the West Region. The building was built in 1924 and designed by Irwin T. Catharine. It was added to the National Register of Historic Places in 1986.

Enrollment for 2020-2021 was 411 students in grades 9 through 12. African Americans make up 94% of the student population. As of 2015, the school principal of Overbrook is  Dr. Kahlila Johnson-Lee; Johnson-Lee graduated from Overbrook in 1989.

Notable alumni

Overbrook is perhaps best known for its famous alumni, who include Wilt Chamberlain  and Will Smith.  At least 11 Overbrook alumni have played in the NBA, and the school is ranked sixth in that respect.

References

External links

 
  at American School Directory
 Demographic & Climate Profile

School District of Philadelphia
School buildings on the National Register of Historic Places in Philadelphia
High schools in Philadelphia
Public high schools in Pennsylvania
Educational institutions established in 1924
1924 establishments in Pennsylvania
Overbrook, Philadelphia
Mass shootings in Pennsylvania
School shootings in the United States